Ampittia tristella is a species of butterfly in the family Hesperiidae. It was described by Shou, Chou and Li in 2006. It is found in China (Shaanxi Province).

References

Butterflies described in 2006
Ampittia